Streptomyces sedi is a bacterium species from the genus of Streptomyces which has been isolated from tissues from the plant Sedum in the Yunnan province in China.

See also 
 List of Streptomyces species

References

Further reading

External links
Type strain of Streptomyces sedi at BacDive -  the Bacterial Diversity Metadatabase	

sedi
Bacteria described in 2009